The Kuban Soviet Republic (April 13 – May 30, 1918) was part of Soviet Russia within the general territory of the Kuban. Its capital was Yekaterinodar.

It was merged into the Kuban-Black Sea Soviet Republic on May 30, 1918, less than 2 months after it was formed.

Background 
In February 1918, the First Congress of Soviets of the Kuban Region was held in  Armavir. One of the first actions undertaken by the Congress was the election of a regional council, which designated the  Soviets as the sole legitimate authority of the Kuban People's Republic and banned the Kuban Rada.

At the end of March, Bolshevik forces had managed to occupy the Kuban capital of Yekaterinodar, which led to the formation of the Yekaterinodar Committee of the Bolsheviks and subsequently the 1st and 2nd Yekaterinodar Communist Regiments.

Creation 
The Second Congress of Soviets of the Kuban Region was held in Yekaterinodar was held from April 1st to April 16th, and was attended by 832 delegates.

On April 13th, the Congress proclaimed the Kuban Soviet Republic. That same day, many in attendance spoke in favor of uniting with the nearby Black Sea Soviet Republic. 

Soon after the creation of the Kuban SR, the Council of People's Commissars was formed, which consisted of sixteen members. Yan Vasilyevich Poluyan was elected as Chairman and Vladimir Cherny was elected as Secretary.

The Kuban-Black Sea Military Revolutionary Committee, a joint command structure between the Kuban and Black Sea SRs, was formed soon after the creation of the Kuban SR.

Formation of the Kuban-Black Sea Soviet Republic 
The Third Extraordinary United Congress of Soviets of the Kuban and Black Sea Soviet Republics was held in Yekaterinodar from May 28th to May 30th, and was attended by 882 delegates.

On May 30th, a proposal for a Central Executive Committee of the Soviets of the Kuban and Black Sea Republics was approved (despite protests from the Left SRs), and the Kuban-Black Sea Soviet Republic was proclaimed shortly after.

References 

Subdivisions of the Russian Soviet Federative Socialist Republic
History of Kuban
Early Soviet republics
Russian-speaking countries and territories
States and territories established in 1918
Former socialist republics
Post–Russian Empire states